The 1924 Denver Pioneers football team was an American football team that represented the University of Denver as a member of the Rocky Mountain Conference (RMC) during the 1924 college football season. In their second and final season under head coach Elmer McDevitt, the Pioneers compiled a 4–2–2 record (3–2–2 against conference opponents), finished in a three-way tie for second place in the RMC, and outscored opponents by a total of 36 to 35.

Schedule

References

Denver
Denver Pioneers football seasons
Denver Pioneers football